Unexplained Canada is a show that aired on Space, a Canadian cable television station. It was a six-part series coming from many different perspectives of historical/social mysteries. It was hosted by John Robert Colombo and premiered January 2006. The show was produced by KarowPrime Films in Canada.

External links
Show's website 

CTV Sci-Fi Channel original programming
2000s Canadian documentary television series
2006 Canadian television series debuts